Torin Myhill (born 2 August 1995) is a Welsh rugby union player who plays for Carmarthen Quins as a hooker. He is a former Wales under-20 international.

Myhill has previously played for Llanelli RFC and the Scarlets. His brother is Kirby Myhill, who previously played for the Scarlets and now plays for the Cardiff Blues.

References

External links 
Scarlets Player Profile
ESPN Player Profile

1995 births
Living people
Rugby union players from Burry Port
Scarlets players
Welsh rugby union players
Carmarthen Quins RFC players
Cardiff Rugby players
Rugby union hookers